The Protestant church of Oentsjerk or Saint Mary church is a medieval religious building in  Oentsjerk, Friesland,  Netherlands. 

The church was built c. 1230 out of red brick and has a tower from the 14th century.  
On the West gallery is a monumental Pipe organ, built in 1871 by P. van Oeckelen 
The church  was originally a Roman Catholic church dedicated to Saint Mary but became a Protestant church after the Protestant Reformation. It is listed as a Rijksmonument, number 35658. The building is located on the Wijnserdijk 9.

References

Tytsjerksteradiel
Oenstjerk
Romanesque architecture in the Netherlands
Rijksmonuments in Friesland
Protestant churches in the Netherlands